Rajaram Godase (born 18 April 1961 in Sansari, Nasik)was a member of the 11th Lok Sabha of India. He represented the Nashik constituency of Maharashtra and is a member of the Shiv Sena political party.

References

India MPs 1996–1997
1961 births
Living people
Marathi politicians
Shiv Sena politicians
Lok Sabha members from Maharashtra
People from Nashik